Vempadu is a village in Nakkapalle mandal in Anakapalli district of Andhra Pradesh state in the southern part of India. Vempadu is located 5 miles south of Nakkapalle on the trunk road.

References

Villages in Anakapalli  district